On 22 September 2013, a twin suicide bombing took place at All Saints Church in Peshawar, Pakistan, in which 127 people were killed and more than 250 injured. It was the deadliest attack on the Christian minority in the history of Pakistan.

Bombs 
The two suicide bombers shot two security guards, killing one and injuring the other. Stopped by the police, one of the bombers detonated his device. The second bomber entered the church and detonated the bomb inside. Another account tells that the suicide bomb blast occurred when the worshippers assembled for a free meal of rice near the front lawn of the church. There were holes in the walls of the church and the windows of the nearby buildings were shattered by the intensity of the blasts. Bodies of the attackers were successfully identified and sent for examination.

Perpetrators of the attack
The Tehrik-i-Taliban Pakistan-linked Islamist group Jundallah claimed responsibility for the attack. They said that the attack on Christians and non-Muslims will continue because they are the enemies of Islam and that they will not stop until US drone attacks in Pakistan cease. However, Tehrik-i-Taliban Pakistan denied any involvement in the incident and denied having any links with the perpetrators, saying that their affiliate is Jundul Hafsa, not Jundallah.

Response of Pakistani Christians
Christians residing near the church went to the streets and started protesting by burning tires and shouting slogans. Many shops were shut in the Kohati Gate area, which is home to many other churches. There were protest rallies in Karachi, Lahore, Multan and other cities to condemn the killing. There were also clashes reported in Karachi between angry protestors and police.

Christian communities in Pakistan lamented "the dying future for Christians in Pakistan" given this was another in a series of recent attacks. In March, hundreds of Christians were persecuted by Islamic zealots over allegations of blasphemy against Islam, a crime under Pakistani law.

Reactions
Prime Minister Nawaz Sharif condemned the attack and said terrorists have no religion and that targeting innocent people is against the teachings of Islam.

See also
 28 October 2009 Peshawar bombing
 Lahore church bombings
 Qissa Khwani Bazaar bombing
 2019 Ghotki riots
 2014 Larkana temple attack
 2009 Gojra riots

References

2013 murders in Pakistan
Church bombing 
21st-century mass murder in Pakistan
Attacks on buildings and structures in 2013
Church bombing
Attacks on churches in Asia
Attacks on religious buildings and structures in Pakistan
Islamic terrorism in Pakistan
Islamic terrorist incidents in 2013
Jundallah (Pakistan) attacks
Mass murder in 2013
Church bombing 
Persecution of Christians in Pakistan
September 2013 crimes in Asia
September 2013 events in Pakistan
Suicide bombings in 2013
Church
Terrorist incidents in Pakistan in 2013
Building bombings in Pakistan
Church bombings by Islamists